Duke or The Duke is a nickname of:

 Duke Aiona (born 1955), American politician
 Duke Brett (1900–1974), American Major League Baseball pitcher (1924–1925) and minor league manager
 Duke Carmel (born 1937), American former Major League Baseball player
 Duke Cunningham (born 1941), American former US Navy fighter pilot and disgraced politician
 George Deukmejian (born 1928), former Governor of California
 David Dickinson (born 1941), British antiques expert and television presenter
 Michael Dukakis (born 1933), former Governor of Massachusetts and Democratic Presidential nominee
 Duke Ellington (1899–1974), American jazz composer, pianist and bandleader
 Nathan Ellington (born 1981), English footballer nicknamed "The Duke" after the jazz bandleader
 Duke Erikson (born 1951), American songwriter, producer, musician and co-founder of the alternative rock band Garbage
 Duke Esper (1868–1910), American Major League Baseball pitcher
 Abdul "Duke" Fakir (born 1935), American singer, last surviving original member of the Four Tops
 Duke Farrell (1866–1925), American Major League Baseball catcher
 Dušan Fabian (born 1975), Slovak author
 Duke Harris (born 1942), Canadian former hockey player
 Robert P. Hedman, American pilot, Flying Tigers "ace in a day" (Christmas Day 1941)
 Marmaduke Hussey, Baron Hussey of North Bradley (1923–2006), former Chairman of the Board of Governors of the BBC
 Duke Iversen (1920–2011), American football player
 Duke Jordan (1922–2006), American jazz pianist
 Duke Keats (1895–1972), Canadian hockey player in the National Hockey League and other leagues
 Wellington Mara (1916–2005), American National Football League executive and co-owner of the New York Giants
 Duke Nalon (1913–2001), American race car driver
 Duke Pearson (1932–1980), American jazz pianist, composer and bandleader
 Duke Reid (1915–1975), Jamaican record producer, DJ and label owner
 Duke Robillard (born 1948), American blues musician
 Duke Roufus (born 1970), American former kickboxer and coach
 Duke Shelley (born 1996), American football player
 Duke Sims (born 1941), American retired Major League Baseball catcher
 Duke Slater (1898–1966), African-American college and professional football player, member of the College Football Hall of Fame
 Duke Snider (1926–2011), American Hall of Fame Major League Baseball player
 John Wayne (1907–1979), American actor
 Duke Worne (1888–1933), American silent film director and actor

See also 

 Duke (disambiguation)
 Duke (surname)
 Orlando Hernández, Major League Baseball pitcher nicknamed "El Duque"
 Mark Viduka (born 1975), Australian retired soccer player nicknamed "Big Dukes"

Lists of people by nickname
Nicknames in film